Azerbaijan competed at the 2013 Summer Universiade in Kazan, Russia from 6 July to 17 July 2013. 88 athletes are a part of the Azerbaijan team. The flagbearer of the team on the opening ceremony was the winner of the 2010 Summer Youth Olympics, weightlifter Nijat Rahimov.

Azerbaijan won 16 medals, including 4 gold medals.

References

Nations at the 2013 Summer Universiade
2013
2013 in Azerbaijani sport